Empuré is a commune in the Charente department in southwestern France.

Bounded on the west by the Fountaine de Frédières, a small tributary of the Aume, the town lies on a plateau, located 3 km northwest of Villefagnan and 13 km west of Ruffec. The main crop is cereals.

The main route is the D27 route which crosses the commune from the north-west to south-east, which passes near the town of Empuré.
The communes contains the hamlets Planchard in the west bordering the commune of Paizay-Naudouin-Embourie, Le Pouyaud to the north of the town and Bellevue etc.

Population

Sights

Église Saint-Maixent, a remarkable building from the twelfth century is characterised by its arched gateway, and the symbolic corbels that adorn its façade. It was classified a historical monument on 9 May 1914.

There is also a chateau in the commune and a town hall, built in the 16th century.

See also
Communes of the Charente department

References

Communes of Charente